Corey Rocchiccioli (born 8 October 1997) is an Australian cricketer who plays as a right-arm off break bowler.
 
Rocchiccioli was offered a rookie contract by Western Australia ahead of the 2020/21 season, where he did not play a match, before being elevated to a senior contract prior to the 2021/22 season. He made his first-class debut on 24 September 2021, for Western Australia against South Australia in the opening match of 2021–22 Sheffield Shield season.

Rocchiccioli was added to the Perth Scorchers squad on 8 December 2020 as injury cover for Ashton Agar during BBL|10, however did not feature in any matches.

Rocchiccioli made his BBL debut in the 2022/23 season for the Melbourne Renegades

References

External links
 

1997 births
Living people
Australian cricketers
Western Australia cricketers
Place of birth missing (living people)